Chik may refer to:
Chik (community), Muslim community in India
Chik (urban-type settlement), urban-type settlement in Novosibirsk Oblast, Russia
Chik, Iran, village in South Khorasan Province, Iran
Chik (name)
CHIK-FM, French-language radio station located in Quebec City, Quebec, Canada

See also

Chi (disambiguation)
CHI (disambiguation)
Chia (disambiguation)
Chick (disambiguation)
Chik (disambiguation)
Chin (disambiguation)
Chink (disambiguation)
Chip (disambiguation)
Chir (disambiguation)
Chiu (disambiguation)